Arlette Ivette Muñoz Cervantes (born 16 September 1983) is a Mexican politician affiliated with the PAN. She  served as Deputy of the LXIII Legislature of the Mexican Congress representing Aguascalientes.

References

1983 births
Living people
Politicians from Aguascalientes
Women members of the Chamber of Deputies (Mexico)
Members of the Chamber of Deputies (Mexico)
National Action Party (Mexico) politicians
21st-century Mexican politicians
21st-century Mexican women politicians
Monterrey Institute of Technology and Higher Education alumni